Diaethria phlogea, the 89'98 butterfly, is a species of butterfly of the family Nymphalidae. It is found in Colombia, South America.

It has been given the nickname "89/98" because of the markings on its wings resembling an 89 and 98.

Some authors consider it to be a subspecies of Diaethria euclides as Diaethria euclides phlogea.

References

Biblidinae
Nymphalidae of South America
Butterflies described in 1868
Taxa named by Osbert Salvin
Taxa named by Frederick DuCane Godman